Utricularia hintonii is a small terrestrial carnivorous plant that belongs to the genus Utricularia. It was originally collected by G. B. Hinton on June 10, 1933, and described as a new species by Peter Taylor in 1986, who named it in honor of Hinton.

See also 
 List of Utricularia species

References 

Carnivorous plants of North America
Endemic flora of Mexico
Flora of the State of Mexico
hintonii